The Panama Fracture Zone is a major, active right lateral-moving transform fault and associated inactive fracture zone which forms part of the tectonic boundary between the Cocos Plate and the Nazca Plate. It is part of the triple junction between the Cocos Plate, Nazca Plate and Caribbean Plate which is moving in the southeastern direction at 5.5 cm/yr.  It runs from the East Pacific Rise to the Middle America Trench.

References
 

 

Fracture zones
Geology of Panama